Río Senguer Department is a  department of Chubut Province in Argentina.

This provincial subdivision has a population of about 6,194 inhabitants in an area of 22,335 km², and its capital city is Alto Río Senguer, which is located around 2,021 km from the Capital federal.

Settlements
Aldea Apeleg
Aldea Beleiro
Alto Rio Mayo
Alto Río Senguer
El Coyte
Doctor Ricardo Rojas
Escuadron Rio Mayo
Facundo
Lago Blanco
Paso Moreno 
Pastos Blancos
La Puerta del Diablo
Rio Guenguel
Río Mayo
Los Tamariscos

See also
Senguerr River

External links
Rio Senguer website 

Departments of Chubut Province